Alan Kardek de Souza (born 22 February 1980), commonly known as Alan Kardek, is a Brazilian football defender. He currently plays for São Cristóvão.

Career
In 2007 and 2008 Alan Kardek appeared in a total of 21 Russian First Division games for Alania. He fell out of favour when, being substituted very early in the first half, he lost his temper, came into conflict with the head coach and threw his shirt on the ground. Soon thereafter he was released from the Russian club.

Kardek has since returned to Brazil to play for likes of Mesquita and São Cristóvão.

External links
  Profile at CBF site
  Profile at stats.sportbox.ru

References

Brazilian footballers
1980 births
Living people
Brazilian expatriate footballers
FC Spartak Vladikavkaz players
Expatriate footballers in Russia
Villa Rio Esporte Clube players
Association football defenders